Australian Walkabout is a TV series made for the ABC and BBC by director Charles Chauvel. It was the last project completed by Chauvel prior to his death.

References

External links
  
Walkabout at National Film and Sound Archive
Australian Walkabout at Australian Screen Online

Australian Broadcasting Corporation original programming
1958 Australian television series debuts
1958 Australian television series endings
Black-and-white Australian television shows
Australian Broadcasting Corporation radio programs